Survex is free and open-source cave surveying software, licensed under the GNU GPL. It is designed to be portable and can be run on a variety of platforms, including Microsoft Windows, Mac OS X, and Unix-like.  Survex is very powerful cave survey software, and is actively developing into a complete cave visualization package.

Centreline data is entered using plain text files, which are processed by 'Cavern'.  The text files contain a hierarchy of cave surveys, each of which consists of a list of survey legs, which join survey stations.  This program calculates the real world coordinates of survey stations, taking into account loop closure errors using least-squares minimization.  This processed data can then be visualised using a GUI front end called Aven.  Survex has no arbitrary limits, and so is particularly good for large complicated cave systems, or areas where you need to see the relationships between multiple cave systems.

Survex was started in 1990 by Olly Betts and Wookey, and more recently Mark Shinwell has developed 'Aven'. Like most cave surveying software, the motivation for its creation arose from a particular surveying project - Cambridge University Caving Club's explorations in Austria.

Survex is currently being used in many large scale survey projects, across the world, for example: UK - Ease Gill Caverns 
Ogof Draenen, 
Spain - Picos de Europa, 
China, 
Austria - Dachstein, Totes Gerbirge, 
Indonesia, 
Mulu

Software That Uses Survex
CaveWhere uses cavern, a program in the Survex package, for loop closure and positioning survey stations to geographical coordinates.

References

External links
 Survex Home Page
 List of cave surveying software (valid in 2001)

Cave surveying
Geology software
Software that uses wxWidgets